Diatto-Clément, Diatto A Clément, was a Franco Italian manufacturer of motor vehicles between 1905 and 1909. Adolphe Clément-Bayard created the 'Diatto-Clément Societa Anonima' in partnership with Diatto who had been coachbuilders in Turin since 1835.

The Diatto-Clément cars, known as Torinos, were built in Turin under licence from Clément, thus in Italy they were known as 'Diatto A Clément'. The first car was the 20-25HP which used a 3,770cc four cylinder engine. This was followed by a 10-12HP (1,884cc two-cylinder) and a 14-18HP (2,724cc four-cylinder). This series was a success and was followed by a six-cylinder model.

In 1909 Clément-Bayard left the business and the company was renamed 'Societa Fonderie Officine Frejus'.

Giovanni Gagliardi drove a Diatto Clément 10/12 hp to class victory in the Milano-Sanremo race on 4–5 April 1906. Entered in the class for 'Cars costing L. 4000 to L. 8000' it covered the 317 km in 9 hours 17 minutes 3 seconds.

References

Defunct motor vehicle manufacturers of France
Defunct motor vehicle manufacturers of Italy
Vehicle manufacturing companies established in 1905
Companies based in Turin
Vintage vehicles
Brass Era vehicles
Italian companies established in 1905